Bharwara is a village in Chinhat block of Lucknow district, Uttar Pradesh, India. It is part of Lucknow tehsil. As of 2011, its population is 3,876, in 678 households.

References 

Villages in Lucknow district